Papyrus 112 (in the Gregory-Aland numbering), designated by 𝔓112, is a fragment from a portion of the New Testament in Greek. It is a papyrus manuscript from the Acts of the Apostles. The surviving portions are parts of Acts 26:31-32 and, on the other side of the sheet, Acts 27:6-7. It is written in uncial characters of uniform size, without any diacritical marks or spacing between words. ὁ ἄνθρωπος ('the man') is written in the Nomen Sacrum form ὁ ἄνος, with a single overline. Based on palaeography, the manuscript has been assigned to the 5th century by the INTF.

The manuscript is currently housed at the Sackler Library (Papyrology Rooms, P. Oxy. 4496) at Oxford.

Text 
In Acts 26:31 it appears to be missing τι, which is found in only about a dozen Greek manuscripts, including Codex Sinaiticus and Codex Alexandrinus (but not Codex Vaticanus), and is supported by most manuscripts of the Latin Vulgate (but not the Old Latin). 

Following ὁ ἄνος οὗτ[ος] (this man) at the end of Acts 26:31, it skips to the next ὁ ἄνος οὗτος (this man) in the following verse, leaving out Ἀγρίππας δὲ τῷ Φήστῳ ἔφη, Ἀπολελύσθαι ἐδύνατο (And Agrippa said to Festus, "Could have been set free"). This is also done in Greek minuscules 326 and 2464.

Following Acts 26:32 it has [καὶ οὕ]τως ἔκρι[νεν ὁ ἡγεμὼν] αὐτὸν ἀν[απεμψαι]. This is slightly transposed from a reading also found in the Greek minuscules 97 and 421, supported by the Old Latin h and a textual note in the margin of the Harclean Syriac.

In Acts 27:7 it has the transposition βρα[δυπλοουντε]ς εν δε ικαν[αις ημεραις. Αll other witnesses have this sentence in the word order: εν ικαναις δε ημεραις βραδυπλοουντες.

See also 

 List of New Testament papyri
 Oxyrhynchus Papyri

References

Further reading 

 T. Finney, "4496. Acts of the Apostles XXVI 31-32; XXVII 6-7" in The Oxyrhynchus Papyri vol. 66 (London: Egypt Exploration Society, 1999) 5–7.

External links

Images 
 P.Oxy.LXIV 4496 from Papyrology at Oxford's "POxy: Oxyrhynchus Online" 
 Image from 𝔓112 recto, fragment of Acts 26:31-32 
 Image from 𝔓112 verso, fragment of Acts 27:6-7

Official registration 
 "Continuation of the Manuscript List" Institute for New Testament Textual Research, University of Münster. Retrieved April 9, 2008 

New Testament papyri
5th-century biblical manuscripts
Acts of the Apostles papyri